The 2002 Ukrainian Amateur Cup  was the seventh annual season of Ukraine's football knockout competition for amateur football teams. The competition started on 14 July 2002 and concluded on 6 October 2002.

Competition schedule

First round (1/8)

Quarterfinals (1/4)
Some teams, Haray Zhovkva and Mukacheve, started at quarterfinals.

Semifinals (1/2)

Final

See also
2002 Ukrainian Football Amateur League
2002–03 Ukrainian Cup

External links
 2002 Ukrainian Amateur Cup  at the Footpass (Football Federation of Ukraine)
 The cup of Ukraine among amateurs 2002 
 The cup of Ukraine among amateurs 2002 

2002
Amateur Cup
Ukrainian Amateur Cup